Karakulinsky District (Karakulino joros) is an administrative and municipal district (raion), one of the twenty-five in the Udmurt Republic, Russia. It is located in the southeast of the republic. Its administrative center is the rural locality (a selo) of Karakulino. Population:  13,835 (2002 Census);  The population of Karakulino accounts for 39.4% of the district's total population.

References

Notes

Sources

Districts of Udmurtia